Saurophaganax ("lord of lizard-eaters") is a genus of large allosaurid dinosaur from the Morrison Formation of Late Jurassic (latest Kimmeridgian age, about 151 million years ago) Oklahoma, United States. Some paleontologists consider it to be a junior synonym and species of Allosaurus (as  A. maximus). Saurophaganax represents a very large Morrison allosaurid characterized by horizontal laminae at the bases of the dorsal neural spines above the transverse processes, and "meat-chopper" chevrons.

Discovery and naming

In 1931 and 1932, John Willis Stovall uncovered remains of a large theropod near Kenton in Cimarron County, Oklahoma in layers of the late Kimmeridgian. In 1941, these were named Saurophagus maximus by Stovall in an article by journalist Grace Ernestine Ray. The specific epithet maximus means "the largest" in Latin. Because the naming article did not contain a description, the name remained a nomen nudum. In 1987, Spencer George Lucas erroneously made OMNH 4666, a tibia, the lectotype, unaware that Saurophagus was a nomen nudum.

Later, it was discovered that the name Saurophagus was preoccupied: in 1831, it had already been given by William Swainson to a tyrant-flycatcher, an extant eater of taxonomically true lizards. In 1995, Daniel Chure named a new genus: Saurophaganax, adding Greek suffix -άναξ, meaning "ruler", to the earlier name. Chure also found OMNH 4666 undiagnostic in relation to Allosaurus, so he chose OMNH 01123, a neural arch, as the holotype for Saurophaganax. — and Saurophaganax is not a renaming of "Saurophagus". Much of the material informally named "Saurophagus maximus", namely those diagnostic elements that could be distinguished from Allosaurus, were referred to Saurophaganax maximus by Chure. They contain disarticulated bones of at least four individuals.

Saurophaganax is the official state fossil of Oklahoma, and a large skeleton of Saurophaganax can be seen in the Jurassic hall in the Sam Noble Oklahoma Museum of Natural History. Although the best known Saurophaganax material was found in the panhandle of Oklahoma, possible Saurophaganax material, NMMNH P-26083, a partial skeleton including a femur, several tail vertebrae, and a hip bone, has been found in northern New Mexico.

Relationship with Allosaurus 
The identification of Saurophaganax is a matter of dispute. It has been described as its own genus, or as a species of Allosaurus: Allosaurus maximus. The most recent reviews of basal tetanurans in 2004 and Carrano et al.'s comprehensive 2012 analysis of Tetanurae accepted Saurophaganax as a distinct genus. Possible Saurophaganax material from New Mexico may clear up the status of the genus.

Description

The fossils known of Saurophaganax (both the possible New Mexican material and the Oklahoma material) are known from the Brushy Basin Member, which is the latest part of the Morrison Formation, suggesting that this genus was either always uncommon or that it first appeared rather late in the Jurassic. Because of the rarity of discovered remains, not much about its behavior is known.

Paleoecology

The Morrison Formation is a sequence of shallow marine and alluvial sediments which, according to radiometric dating, ranges between 156.3 million years old (Ma) at its base, to 146.8 million years old at the top, which places it in the late Oxfordian, Kimmeridgian, and early Tithonian stages of the Late Jurassic period. This formation is interpreted as a semiarid environment with distinct wet and dry seasons. The Morrison Basin where dinosaurs lived, stretched from New Mexico to Alberta and Saskatchewan, and was formed when the precursors to the Front Range of the Rocky Mountains started pushing up to the west. The deposits from their east-facing drainage basins were carried by streams and rivers and deposited in swampy lowlands, lakes, river channels and floodplains. This formation is similar in age to the Solnhofen Limestone Formation in Germany and the Tendaguru Formation in Tanzania. In 1877, this formation became the center of the Bone Wars, a fossil-collecting rivalry between early paleontologists Othniel Charles Marsh and Edward Drinker Cope. 

The Morrison Formation records an environment and time dominated by gigantic sauropod dinosaurs such as Barosaurus, Apatosaurus, Brontosaurus, Camarasaurus, Diplodocus, and Brachiosaurus. Dinosaurs that lived alongside Saurophaganax, and may have served as prey, included the herbivorous ornithischians Camptosaurus, Dryosaurus, Stegosaurus, and Nanosaurus. Predators in this paleoenvironment included the theropods Torvosaurus, Ceratosaurus, Marshosaurus, Stokesosaurus, Ornitholestes, and Allosaurus, which accounted for 70 to 75% of theropod specimens and was at the top trophic level of the Morrison food web. Other vertebrates that shared this paleoenvironment included ray-finned fishes, frogs such as Eobatrachus, salamanders, turtles, sphenodonts, lizards, terrestrial and aquatic crocodylomorphs like Goniopholis, and several species of pterosaur like Kepodactylus. Early mammals were present in this region, such as Fruitafossor, docodonts, multituberculates, symmetrodonts, and triconodonts. The flora of the period has been revealed by fossils of green algae, fungi, mosses, horsetails, cycads, ginkgoes, and several families of conifers. Vegetation varied from river-lining forests of tree ferns, and ferns (gallery forests), to fern savannas with occasional trees such as the Araucaria-like conifer Brachyphyllum. In Oklahoma, Stovall unearthed a considerable number of Apatosaurus specimens, which may have represented possible prey for a large theropod like Saurophaganax.

Bite marks on Allosaurus and Mymoorapelta remains were found among other bones with feeding traces in the Upper Jurassic Mygatt-Moore Quarry. Unlike the others, these have left striations that, when measured to determine denticle width, produced tooth and body size extrapolations greater than any known specimen of Allosaurus or Ceratosaurus, the two large predators known for osteological remains from the quarry. The extrapolations are instead coherent either with an unusually large specimen of Allosaurus, or a separate large taxon like Torvosaurus or Saurophaganax, both of which are not known from the quarry. The result either increases the known diversity of the site based on ichnological evidence alone, or represents powerful evidence of cannibalism in Allosaurus. Based on the position and nutrient value associated with the various skeletal elements with bite marks, it is predicted that while Mymoorapelta was either predated upon or scavenged shortly after death, Allosaurus was scavenged some time after death.

References

Sources

Allosaurids
Late Jurassic dinosaurs of North America
Tithonian life
Dinosaurs of the Morrison Formation
Paleontology in Oklahoma
Fossil taxa described in 1995
Apex predators